Maxime Boccon (born 17 June 1974 in Vesoul) is a French sprint canoer who competed in the early 2000s. At the 2000 Summer Olympics in Sydney, he was eliminated in the semifinals of the K-4 1000 m event.

References
 Sports-Reference.com profile

External links
 

Sportspeople from Vesoul
1974 births
Canoeists at the 2000 Summer Olympics
French male canoeists
Living people
Olympic canoeists of France